Second Thought(s) may refer to:

Film and television 
 Second Thoughts (1938 film), a British film directed by Albert Parker
 Second Thoughts (1983 film), an American film starring Lucie Arnaz
 Second Thoughts (TV series), a British situation comedy
 "Second Thoughts" (The Outer Limits), a 1997 episode of The Outer Limits television series

Other uses 
 Second Thoughts (album), a 1976 album by Split Enz
 Second Thoughts (Shobhaa De novel), a 1996 novel by Shobha De
 Second Thoughts (Michel Butor novel), a 1957 novel by Michel Butor
 Second Thoughts, a series of conferences organized by Peter Collier and David Horowitz
 "2nd Thought", song by Orchestral Manoeuvres in the Dark from the album Organisation